Pool B of the 2014 Women's Rugby World Cup was composed of 2010 World Cup champions New Zealand, Ireland, United States and Kazakhstan. Ireland won the group with three wins—including a surprise win over New Zealand—and one bonus point (against Kazakhstan).

New Zealand vs Kazakhstan

United States vs Ireland

United States vs Kazakhstan

New Zealand vs Ireland

Ireland vs Kazakhstan

New Zealand vs United States

Notes

Pool B
2014–15 in Irish rugby union
2014 in American rugby union
2014 in New Zealand rugby union
rugby union
rugby union
rugby union
rugby union